Barry Wallace may refer to:

 Barry Wallace, guitarist with The Fratellis, an indie rock band from Glasgow, Scotland
 Barry Wallace (footballer) (1959–2006), English football (soccer) defender